This is a list of plane crashes that have occurred because of controlled flight into terrain (CFIT), an accident in which an airworthy aircraft, under pilot control, is unintentionally flown into the ground, a mountain, a body of water or an obstacle.

2012 Mount Salak Sukhoi Superjet crash

On 9 May 2012, a Sukhoi Superjet 100 airliner on a demonstration tour in Indonesia crashed into Mount Salak, in the province of West Java. All 37 passengers and eight crew on board were killed. The plane had taken off minutes before from Jakarta's Halim Airport on a promotional flight for the recently launched jet, and was carrying Sukhoi personnel and representatives of various local airlines. While flying through clouds, the aircraft's ground proximity warning system sounded in the cockpit. The pilots disregarded it, believing it to be an error, and seconds later, the aircraft crashed into the side of Mount Salak at an altitude of 6,270 feet (1910 m).

The subsequent investigation concluded that the flight crew was unaware of the presence of high ground in the area and ignored warnings from the terrain warning system, incorrectly concluding the warnings to a system malfunction due to thick clouds blocking outside view. In the minutes leading to the accident, the crew, including the captain, were found to have been engaged in conversation with prospective customers present in the cockpit.

Korean Air Flight 801
Korean Air Flight 801 (KE801, KAL801) was a scheduled international passenger flight operated by Korean Air. The flight crashed on August 6, 1997, on approach to Antonio B. Won Pat International Airport, in the United States territory of Guam, killing 228 of the 254 people aboard. The aircraft crashed on Nimitz Hill in Asan-Maina, Guam, while on approach to the airport. The National Transportation Safety Board cites poor communication between the flight crew as probable cause for the crash, along with the captain’s poor decision making on the non-precision approach.

American Airlines Flight 965
American Airlines Flight 965 was a regularly scheduled flight from Miami International Airport in Miami, Florida, to Alfonso Bonilla Aragón International Airport in Cali, Colombia. On December 20, 1995, the Boeing 757-200 flying this route crashed into a mountain in Buga, Colombia, killing 151 out of the 155 passengers and all eight crew members.

The Colombian Special Administrative Unit of Civil Aeronautics investigated the accident and determined it was caused by navigational errors by the flight crew.

The crash was the first U.S.-owned 757 accident and is currently the deadliest aviation accident to occur in Colombia.

Flying Tiger Line Flight 66
Flying Tiger Line Flight 66 was a scheduled international cargo flight from Singapore Changi Airport, in Changi, Singapore, to Hong Kong's Kai Tak Airport in the Kowloon Peninsula via a stopover at Kuala Lumpur International Airport (now Sultan Abdul Aziz Shah Airport), in Subang, Selangor, near Kuala Lumpur, Malaysia. On February 19, 1989, the FedEx-owned Boeing 747-249F-SCD crashed while on its final approach to Kuala Lumpur. The aircraft impacted a hillside 437 feet above sea level and 12 kilometers (6.5 nautical miles) from the airport, resulting in all four crew members being killed.

Eastern Air Lines Flight 980
Eastern Air Lines Flight 980 was a scheduled international flight from Asunción, Paraguay, to Miami, Florida, United States. On January 1, 1985, while descending towards La Paz, Bolivia, for a scheduled stopover, the Boeing 727 jetliner struck Mount Illimani at an altitude of 19,600 feet (6,000 m), killing all 29 people on board.

The wreckage was scattered over a large area of a glacier covered with snow. Over the decades, several search expeditions were only able to recover a small amount of debris, and searches for the flight recorders were unsuccessful. The accident remains the highest-altitude controlled flight into terrain in commercial aviation history. The exact cause of the accident has never been determined.

Air New Zealand Flight 901
Air New Zealand Flight 901 (TE-901) was a scheduled Air New Zealand Antarctic sightseeing flight that operated between 1977 and 1979. The flight would leave Auckland Airport in the morning and spend a few hours flying over the Antarctic continent, before returning to Auckland in the evening via Christchurch. On 28 November 1979, the fourteenth flight of TE-901, a McDonnell Douglas DC-10-30, registration ZK-NZP, flew into Mount Erebus on Ross Island, Antarctica, killing all 237 passengers and 20 crew on board. The accident became known as the Mount Erebus disaster.

The initial investigation concluded the accident was caused by pilot error, but public outcry led to the establishment of a Royal Commission of Inquiry into the crash. The commission, presided over by Justice Peter Mahon QC, concluded that the accident was caused by a correction made to the coordinates of the flight path the night before the disaster, coupled with a failure to inform the flight crew of the change, with the result that the aircraft, instead of being directed by computer down McMurdo Sound (as the crew had been led to believe), was instead re-routed to a path toward Mount Erebus. Justice Mahon's report accused Air New Zealand of presenting "an orchestrated litany of lies" and this led to changes in senior management at the airline.

The accident is New Zealand's deadliest peacetime disaster, as well as the deadliest accident in the history of Air New Zealand.

Eastern Air Lines Flight 401
Eastern Air Lines Flight 401 was a scheduled flight from New York JFK to Miami. Shortly before midnight on December 29, 1972, the Lockheed L-1011 TriStar crashed into the Florida Everglades, causing 101 fatalities. The pilots and the flight engineer, two of 10 flight attendants, and 96 of 163 passengers died; 75 passengers and crew survived.

The crash occurred while the entire cockpit crew was preoccupied with a burnt-out landing gear indicator light. They failed to notice that the autopilot had inadvertently been disconnected, and as a result, the aircraft gradually lost altitude and crashed. This was the first fatal crash of a wide-body aircraft. It was also the first hull loss and first fatal crash of a Lockheed L-1011 TriStar.

Winter Hill air disaster
The Winter Hill air disaster occurred on 27 February 1958, when the Silver City Airways Bristol 170 Freighter G-AICS, operated by Manx Airlines on a charter flight from the Isle of Man to Manchester, England, crashed during heavy snow into Winter Hill (also known as Rivington Moor), 5 miles (8.0 km) southeast of Chorley. Thirty-five people died and all seven survivors were injured; the cause was determined to be navigational errors.

1947 BSAA Avro Lancastrian Star Dust accident

On 2 August 1947, Star Dust, a British South American Airways  Avro Lancastrian airliner operating as flight CS59 from Buenos Aires, Argentina, to Santiago, Chile, crashed into Mount Tupungato, in the Argentine Andes. An extensive search operation failed to locate the wreckage, despite covering the area of the crash site, and the fate of the aircraft and its occupants remained unknown for over 50 years, giving rise to various conspiracy theories about its disappearance.

In the late 1990s, pieces of wreckage from the missing aircraft began to emerge from the glacial ice. Now, the crew is believed to have become confused as to their exact location while flying at high altitudes through the (then poorly understood) jet stream. Mistakenly believing they had already cleared the mountain tops, they started their descent when they were, in fact, still behind cloud-covered peaks, and Star Dust crashed into Mount Tupungato, killing all 11 passengers and crew aboard and burying itself in snow and ice.

Thai Airways International Flight 311

On Friday, 31 July 1992, an Airbus A310-304 on the route, registration HS-TID, crashed on approach to Kathmandu. At 07:00:26 UTC (12:45:26 NST; 14:00:26 ICT), the aircraft crashed into the side of a mountain 37 kilometres (23 mi) north of Kathmandu at an altitude of 11,500 ft (3,505 m) and a ground speed of 300 knots (560 km/h; 350 mph), killing all 99 passengers and 14 crew members on board. This was both the first hull loss and the first fatal accident involving the Airbus A310.

Nepalese authorities found that the probable causes of the accident were the captain and air traffic controller's loss of situational awareness; language and technical problems caused the captain to experience frustration and a high workload; the first officer's lack of initiative and inconclusive answers to the captain's questions; the air traffic controller's inexperience, poor grasp of English, and reluctance to interfere with what he saw as piloting matters such as terrain separation; poor supervision of the inexperienced air traffic controller; Thai Airways International's failure to provide simulator training for the complex Kathmandu approach to its pilots; and improper use of the aircraft's flight management system.

Pakistan International Airlines Flight 268 

Pakistan International Airlines Flight 268 was an Airbus A300, registration AP-BCP, which crashed while approaching Kathmandu's Tribhuvan International Airport on 28 September 1992. All 167 people on board were killed. Flight 268 is the worst crash of Pakistan International Airlines, and the worst to ever occur in Nepal.

Investigators determined that the accident had been caused mainly by pilot error. Visibility was poor due to overcast and the ground proximity warning system would not have been triggered in time because of the steep terrain. The approach plates for Kathmandu issued to PIA pilots were also determined to be unclear, and Nepalese air traffic controllers were judged timid and reluctant to intervene in what they saw as piloting matters such as terrain separation. The report recommended that ICAO review navigational charts and encourage their standardisation, and that the approach to Kathmandu Airport be changed to be less complex.

See also
Ground Proximity Warning System
Terrain Awareness And Warning System
Boeing 747 hull losses
Thai Airways International Flight 311
PIA Flight 268
1961 Ndola United Nations DC-6 crash
Trigana Air Flight 267
Santa Barbara Airlines Flight 518
Northwest Airlink Flight 5719
Alitalia Flight 404
Smolensk air disaster
IFO 21
Avianca Flight 410
Ansett New Zealand Flight 703
SAS Flight 933
Cory Lidle plane crash
Garuda Indonesia Flight 152
Lion Air Flight 904
Turkish Airlines Flight 452
Korean Airlines Flight 803
Turkish Airlines Flight 6491

Notes

References

Airliner accidents and incidents caused by pilot error
CFIT